Aqcheh Qaleh, also rendered as Aqjeh Qaleh or Aghcheh Ghaleh or Aghjeh Qaleh or Akcha-Kalekh or Aqcha Qaleh, may refer to:

Aqcheh Qaleh, Markazi
Aqcheh Qaleh, Qazvin
Aqjeh Qaleh, Zanjan